The A 17 road is an A-Grade trunk road in Sri Lanka. It connects Galle with Madampe.

The A 17 passes through Bogahagoda, Imaduwa, Kananke, Akuressa, Pitabeddara, Morawaka, Kotapola, Deniyaya, Suriyakanda and Rakwana to reach Madampe.

References

Highways in Sri Lanka